A perpetuity is an annuity that has no end, or a stream of cash payments that continues forever. There are few actual perpetuities in existence.  For example, the United Kingdom (UK) government issued them in the past; these were known as consols and were all finally redeemed in 2015. Real estate and preferred stock are among some types of investments that affect the results of a perpetuity, and prices can be established using techniques for valuing a perpetuity. Perpetuities are but one of the time value of money methods for valuing financial assets. Perpetuities are a form of ordinary annuities.

The concept is closely linked to terminal value and terminal growth rate in valuation.

Detailed description
A perpetuity is an annuity in which the periodic payments begin on a fixed date and continue indefinitely. It is sometimes referred to as a perpetual annuity. Fixed coupon payments on permanently invested (irredeemable) sums of money are prime examples of perpetuities. Scholarships paid perpetually from an endowment fit the definition of perpetuity.

The value of the perpetuity is finite because receipts that are anticipated far in the future have extremely low present value (present value of the future cash flows).  Unlike a typical bond, because the principal is never repaid, there is no present value for the principal.  Assuming that payments begin at the end of the current period, the price of a perpetuity is simply the coupon amount over the appropriate discount rate or yield; that is,

where PV = present value of the perpetuity, A = the amount of the periodic payment, and r = yield, discount rate or interest rate.

To give a numerical example, a 3% UK government war loan will trade at 50 pence per pound in a yield environment of 6%, while at 3% yield it is trading at par. That is, if the face value of the loan is £100 and the annual payment £3, the value of the loan is £50 when market interest rates are 6%, and £100 when they are 3%.

The duration, or the price-sensitivity to a small change in the interest rate r, of a perpetuity is given by the following formula:

 

This of course follows the fact that for bigger changes the new price must be calculated with the present-value formula given that for changes greater than a few basis-points the calculated duration is not reflective of the true-change in price.

Real-life examples

Valuing real estate with a capitalization rate or cap rate (the convention used in real estate finance) is a more current example.  Using a cap rate, the value of a particular real estate asset is either the net income or the net cash flow of the property, divided by the cap rate.  Effectively, the use of a cap rate to value a piece of real estate assumes that the current income from the property continues in perpetuity. Underlying this valuation is the assumption that rents will rise at the same rate as inflation. Although the property may be sold in future (or even the very near future), the assumption is that other investors will apply the same valuation approach to the property.

UK government perpetuities (called consols) were undated as well as irredeemable  except by act of Parliament. As with war bonds, they paid fixed coupons (interest payments), and traded actively in the bond market until the government redeemed them in 2015.  Very long dated bonds have financial characteristics that can appeal to some investors and in some circumstances: e.g. long-dated bonds have prices that change rapidly (either up or down) when yields change (fall or rise) in the financial markets.

The constant growth dividend discount model for the valuation of the common stock of a corporation is another example. This model assumes that the market price per share is equal to the discounted stream of all future dividends, which is assumed to be perpetual. If the discount rate for stocks (shares) with this level of systematic risk is 12.50%, then a constant perpetuity of dividend income per dollar is eight dollars.  However, if the future dividends represent a perpetuity increasing at 5.00% per year, then the dividend discount model, in effect, subtracts 5.00% off the discount rate of 12.50% for 7.50% implying that the price per dollar of income is $13.33.

References

See also

Geometric progression
Perpetual bond
Jacob Lund Fisker

Mathematical finance
Annuities